Doss is a small unincorporated community in Dent County, Missouri, United States. It is located approximately five miles south of Salem.

A post office called Doss was in operation from 1888 to 1966. The community has the name of William Doss, a local newspaper publisher.

References

Unincorporated communities in Dent County, Missouri
Unincorporated communities in Missouri